The Premios Tu Música Urbano is an award presented by television network Telemundo Puerto Rico to recognize artists who "transcended and boosted the success of Latin urban music around the world." The show is held annually at the José Miguel Agrelot Coliseum in Puerto Rico since 2019, is produced by Telemundo, Sora & Company and Mr. & Mrs. Entertainment, and is broadcast by Telemundo Puerto Rico in Latin America and by Telemundo in the United States. The awards were created in response to the lack of representation of reggaeton and Latin trap artists in the Latin Grammy Awards main categories and the absence of a separate Latin urban category at the Grammy Awards.

History

Following the exclusion of urban nominations in the Album, Record and Song of the Year categories for the 20th Latin Grammy Awards, Colombian singer J Balvin posted an image depicting a crossed-out gramophone with the caption "Sin reggaeton, no hay Latin Grammy" ("Without reggaeton, there are no Latin Grammys"). The message was soon endorsed by other reggaeton artists, including Puerto Rican rappers Daddy Yankee and Tego Calderón, American singer Nicky Jam, Colombian singers Karol G and Maluma and Puerto Rican singer Farruko, who criticized its lack of nominations despite it being one of the most popular genres in the world.

Billboards vice president for Latin music, Leila Cobo, supported their discontent, writing that the "Latin Academy has never shown much fondness for reggaeton as a genre" and proposed the creation of a "Latin Grammy reggaeton task force" in order to "foster diversity". The Latin Recording Academy responded the controversy by stating that its members "select what they believe merits a nomination" and invited the "leaders of the urban community to get involved" with the nomination process, since "many" reggaeton artists were not registered Latin Grammy voters and "many independent labels and producers [had] no notion of the process of submitting product and becoming a voting member".

The Latin Recording Academy was also accused of "whitewashing" due to Spanish artists Alejandro Sanz and Rosalía receiving the most nominations at the 20th Latin Grammy Awards. The Grammy Awards' Recording Academy was also criticized for its Best Latin Rock, Alternative or Urban Album category, to which Rebeca León, J Balvin's manager and member of the academy's diversity and inclusion task force, referred to as Mexican rock band Zoé competing against J Balvin or American pop rock group Panic! At The Disco versus rapper Travis Scott. She also questioned the absence of a separate Latin urban category. Rolling Stones Suzy Exposito criticized the Best Latin Rock, Alternative or Urban Album category for being a "hodgepodge".

In response to the lack of nominees and awards for reggaeton and Latin trap at the Grammy and Latin Grammy Awards, Telemundo Puerto Rico announced the Premios Tu Música Urbano to honor Latin urban music artists. Previously, a short-lived Latin urban-oriented awards show, the People's Choice Reggaetón & Urban Awards, was held during the mid-2000s at the José Miguel Agrelot Coliseum, but was cancelled due to production errors and the absence of famous artists. There was also a separate Best Latin Urban Album category at the Grammy Awards for two years before being merged with the Best Latin Rock/Alternative Performance category in 2010. The first edition of the Premios Tu Música Urbano was held on March 21, 2019, also at the José Miguel Agrelot Coliseum.

Following the controversy, the categories Best Reggaeton Performance and Best Rap/Hip Hop Song were created for the 21st Latin Grammy Awards, where J Balvin, Karol G, Maluma, Daddy Yankee, Puerto Rican acts Anuel AA, Bad Bunny and Ozuna, Puerto Rican producer Tainy and Colombian producer Sky received nominations for Album, Record and/or Song of the Year. J Balvin was the edition's most nominated artist, followed by Bad Bunny, Ozuna and Anuel AA. Gabriel Abaroa Jr., President of the Latin Recording Academy, stated that "[they] continued engaging in discussions with [their] members to improve the awards process" and that they are now "engaged, better informed, and committed to elevating and honoring musical excellence across all genres of Latin music." The Recording Academy added the Best Música Urbana Album category for the 64th Grammy Awards.

Voting
The voting system is based on a pool of voters composed of 200 producers, influencers, radio directors and programmers, all specialized in urban music. The event's co-producer, Shirley Rodríguez, has stated that "sales, downloads and streaming are all taken in consideration to make the final decision."

Ceremonies

Categories
Musical works not restricted by genre, gender or other criteria are nominated in the Artist, Song, Collaboration, Remix, Producer, Songwriter, and Video of the Year categories. The Album of the Year category was split into male and female since the second edition of the awards. Most categories are restricted by genre, gender and nationality. Special awards are given to recognize careers and humanitarian efforts. Recipients of special awards include Daddy Yankee, Nicky Jam, Puerto Rican duo Wisin & Yandel, Colombian singer Sebastián Yatra, Puerto Rican soloists Farruko, Arcángel, De La Ghetto and Tito El Bambino and American salsa singer Victor Manuelle.

Leading winners

As of the third edition of the Premios Tu Música Urbano, held in 2022, Daddy Yankee and Ozuna are the artists with the most wins, with 12 each, followed by Karol G, with 10. Karol G received the most awards in a single night, with nine at the third edition in 2022. Wisin & Yandel and American-based boy band CNCO are the groups with the most wins, with three each.

References

Latin music awards
Awards established in 2019
Spanish-language music
Performing arts trophies